Humphrey Lloyd may refer to:

 Humphrey Llwyd (1527–1568), Welsh cartographer, author, antiquary and Member of Parliament
 Humphrey Lloyd (by 1498–1562 or later), Member of Parliament for Montgomeryshire
 Humphrey Lloyd (physicist) (1800–1881), provost of Trinity College, Dublin, 1867–1881
 Humphrey Lloyd (bishop) (1610–1689), Bishop of Bangor, 1674–1689

See also
 Mount Humphrey Lloyd, a mountain in Victoria Land, Antarctica, named for the provost of Trinity College